Luigi Basiletti (18 April 1780 – 25 January 1859) was an Italian painter, engraver, architect, and archeologist.

Biography
He was born in Brescia. He was a pupil of Sante Cattaneo, then moved to Bologna, and in 1806 to Rome. He painted sacred subjects, mythology as well as landscapes.

He painted a Cascade at Tivoli for the Brera Academy at Milan. He is also represented by a Niobe and the landscapes Lago d’Iseo, Tempio di Sibilla, and Pozzuoli at the Galleria Tosio Martinengo in Brescia. Among other works are a Guardian Angel for the Duomo Vecchio of Brescia. He painted the Ferimento di Baiardo (1828) now in the Atheneum of Brescia. He painted frescoes for rooms in the Atheneum, and the Palazzo Martinengo.

He contributed to the architectural decoration of the cupola by Luigi Cagnola for the Duomo Nuovo of Brescia (1820) and with the architect Vita a design for the Mercato del Grano (1820–1823). He designed the entrance staircase to the parish church of Gussago. He formed part of an archeologic commission in 1823 established in Brescia. He became an associate of the Brescian Atheneum (1810) and censor (1816–1844) and was admitted as an associated of the Brera Academy (1828).

External links

Sources

1780 births
1859 deaths
Architects from Brescia
18th-century Italian painters
Italian male painters
19th-century Italian painters
Artists from Brescia
19th-century Italian male artists
18th-century Italian male artists